The Border Belt Independent (BBI) is an American online newspaper which covers affairs in the North Carolina Border Belt, an area comprising Scotland, Robeson, Columbus, and Bladen counties. It is overseen by the nonprofit Border Belt Reporting Center.

History 
In the 2010s, Les High, the editor of The News Reporter, a print newspaper based in Whiteville, North Carolina, began considering creating a nonprofit news center to cover affairs in several counties in southeastern North Carolina. Following the conducting of a feasibility study by the North Carolina Local News Lab and after receiving a $450,000 grant from the Kate B. Reynolds Charitable Trust, High incorporated the nonprofit Border Belt Reporting Center in April 2021. The name was chosen in homage to North Carolina's historical Border Belt tobacco growing region. The Border Belt Independent, its publication, began operating in May.

Structure and coverage 
High serves as the president of the Border Belt Independent's board of directors. It is edited by Sarah Nagem and has an additional full-time reporter. The paper covers news in Scotland, Robeson, Columbus, and Bladen counties, four of the poorest counties in North Carolina. It allows other regional newspapers to republish its reporting.

References 

Non-profit organizations based in North Carolina
Newspapers published in North Carolina
2021 establishments in North Carolina